The Ghana national futsal team is controlled by the Ghana Football Association, the governing body for futsal in Ghana and represents the country in international futsal competitions.

Tournaments

FIFA Futsal World Cup
 1989 to 1992 – Did not enter
 1996 – Did not qualify
 2000 to 2016 – Did not enter
 2020 – To be determined

Africa Futsal Cup of Nations
 1996 –  Second Place
 2000 – Did not enter
 2004 – Did not enter
 2008 – Did not enter
 2011 – Cancelled
 2016 – Did not enter

References

External links
Ghana Football Association

Ghana
futsal
Futsal in Ghana